The Roman Catholic Metropolitan Archdiocese of Pondicherry and Cuddalore  is an archdiocese located in the cities of Pondicherry and Cuddalore in India.

History
With a land area of 11,348 square kilometers, the Archdiocese of Pondicherry-Cuddalore extends over the Pondicherry and Karaikal civil districts of Puducherry union territory and the civil districts of Cuddalore and Viluppuram of Tamil Nadu state. In 2001, the total population of the area was 6,151,891. Ethnic groups in the territory include the Tamils and French.

The Mission of The Capuchins And The Jesuits 
French Capuchins were the first missionaries to Pondicherry in 1632. But they established the first Christian stable mission only in 1674. The great ancestor of this Archdiocese is the Carnatic Mission, which was started around the year 1700 as Mission sui iuris. This Carnatic Mission was known as Missions of the Coromandel Coast and also as the Malabar Mission.

Before the establishment of the Carnatic Mission in 1700, the Jesuit Fathers of the Madurai Mission, especially John de Britto, entered the Gingee kingdom after 1660, and preached the Gospel up to the Palar River, south of Madras.  Members of various religious orders, looked after the spiritual needs of the European communities in their trading centres along the coastal areas, including Cuddalore and Porto Novo.  The French Capuchins first settled in Pondicherry in 1674 and the French Jesuits, expelled from Siam also took refuge with the Capuchins in Pondicherry in 1688. But, in 1693, the Dutch chased away all the religious groups from Pondicherry, and they were only able to return in 1699. While the Capuchins were looking after the Europeans in Pondicherry, the French Jesuits organized the Carnatic Mission for the Indian people.

The Boundaries Of the Carnatic Mission
The boundaries of the Carnatic mission were as follows:
 To the south and west, the Pennaiyar River, beyond which were the Madurai and Mysore missions
 To the east, the Bay of Bengal
 To the north, Kurnool, including the Krishna and Godavari areas near the coast.

Jesuits Replaced By Foreign Mission Fathers
The continual wars in the 18th century, the ruin of Pondicherry town in 1761 and the suppression of the Society of Jesus in 1773, badly hit the vast Carnatic Mission.

In 1776, the French Jesuit fathers were replaced at the order of Rome by the foreign Mission French Fathers. Although the Bishop of these new missionaries had all the power of jurisdiction, he was not given the title "Vicar Apostolic", but instead called the "Superior of the Mission of the Coromandel Coast." Rome successively gave him the  jurisdiction over the Madurai, Coimbatore and Mysore areas, affected by the suppression of the Society of Jesus. By 1800, the extent of the Carnatic Mission was immense, but the labourers were very few.

The First Vicar Apostolic And The First Archbishop
The Carnatic Mission was reorganized when new apostolic vicariates were created: Madras in 1832, Madurai in 1836, and the vicariates of Visakhapatnam, Mysore and Coimbatore in 1845.

Pondicherry became an apostolic vicariate of the Coromandel coast, on 1 September 1836, with Mgr. Bonnand as its first vicar apostolic. This apostolic vicariate was raised to an archbishopric on 1 September 1886, with Mgr. Laouenan as the first archbishop.

Subsequently, subdivisions of the archdiocese took place, creating the new dioceses of Kumbakonam in 1899 and Salem in 1930. In 1928 a great part of the present diocese of Vellore was separated from Pondicherry and attached to the archdiocese of Madras and Mylapore. On a reorganisation of the archdiocese by Rome in 1969, the Madurantagam taluk of Kanchipuram district was transferred to Madras, and Tiruvannamalai taluk to Vellore .

The Final Formation

As  the archdiocese of Pondicherry extended over the Pondicherry union territory and the South Arcot district of Madras State, on 7 August 1953 it was given a new title by Rome:  the "Archdiocese of  Pondicherry and Cuddalore".

Originally, the archdiocese included the former French settlements of Pondicherry, Karaikal, Chandannagar, Mahe, and Yanam. Another ex-French settlement was also looked after by the MSFS Fathers in Visakhapatnam.  Chandannagar was re-allocated to the archdiocese of Calcutta, now Kolkata, and Mahé to the Kerala diocese of Calicut, now Kozhikode, in 1949.

The present archdiocese of  Pondicherry and Cuddalore extends over the Pondicherry and Karaikal districts of Puducherry and the Cuddalore (excluding Chidambaram and Kattumannarkoil taluks) and Viluppuram districts of Tamil Nadu.

Leadership

Superior of Karnatic Mission / Pondicherry
 Pierre Brigot (1776–1791)
 Nicolas Champenois (1791–1801)

Vicars Apostolic
 Louis-Charles-Auguste Hébert (1810–1835)
 Clément Bonnand, M.E.P. (3 April 1850 – 21 March 1861)
 Joseph-Isidore Godelle, M.E.P. (21 March 1861 – 15 July 1867)
 François-Jean-Marie Laouënan, M.E.P. (24 July 1868 – 29 September 1892)

Archbishops

 Joseph-Adolphe Gandy, M.E.P. (29 September 1892 – 25 March 1909)
 Elie-Jean-Joseph Morel, M.E.P. (11 May 1909 – 16 August 1929)
 Auguste-Siméon Colas, M.E.P. (24 June 1930 – 28 October 1955)
 Ambrose Rayappan (28 November 1955 – 17 March 1973)
 Venmani S. Selvanather (17 March 1973 - 18 February 1992)
 Michael Augustine (18 February 1992 – 10 June 2004 )
 Antony Anandarayar (10 June 2004 – 27 January 2021)
 Francis Kalist (19 March 2022 – Incumbent)

Apostolic Administrator

 Bishop Peter Abir Antonisamy (27 January 2021 - 19 March 2022).  Upon the resignation of Archbishop Antony Anandarayar, for the first time in the history of Archdiocese, an Apostolic Admistrator was appointed by Pope Francis. Bishop Peter Abir Antonisamy (Bishop of Sulthanpet) was appointed as the Apostolic Admistrator of the Archdiocese. He ceased to be the Apostolic Administrator by the appointment of Most. Rev. Francis Kalist as Archbishop of Pondicherry and Cuddalore.

Bishops and Cardinals from this Archdiocese

Bishops
The following bishops were ordained to priesthood for Archdiocese of Pondicherry and Cuddalore and later were appointed as Bishops of various dioceses. They are:
 Ubagarasamy Bernadeth, Bishop of Coimbatore (1940)
 Joseph Mark Gopu, Auxiliary Bishop of Pondicherry (1948), Archbishop of  Hyderabad (1953)
 Joseph S. Thumma, Bishop of Vijayawada (1970)
 Michael Duraisamy, Bishop of Salem (1974)
 Archbishop Michael Augustine, Auxiliary Bishop of Madras-Mylapore (1978), Bishop of Vellore (1981) and Archbishop of Pondicherry (1992)
 Antony Anandarayar, Bishop of Ooty (1997) and Archbishop of Pondicherry (2004)
 Yvon Ambrose, Bishop of Tuticorin (2005)
 Peter Abir Antonisamy, Bishop of Sultanpet (2013)
 Arulselvam Rayappan, Bishop of Salem (2021)

The following are the bishops who are native of the Archdiocese of Pondicherry but were ordained as priests in another diocese or religious order:
Archbishop Malayappan Chinnappa,S.D.B., Bishop of Vellore (1992), Archbishop of Madras-Mylapore (2005).
Bishop Anthonysamy Neethinathan, (Clergy of Madras-Mylapore) Bishop of Chinglepet (2002)

Cardinal
 Duraisamy Simon Lourdusamy (b.1985 - d.2014)

Suffragan dioceses
Suffragan dioceses under this archdiocese are:

 Dharmapuri
 Kumbakonam
 Salem
 Tanjore

Saints and causes for canonisation
 Servant of God Fr. Louis Savinien Dupuis, MEP

See also
Apostolic Prefecture of French Colonies in India

References

External links
 GCatholic.org
 Archdiocese of Pondicherry and Cuddalore at Catholic Hierarchy 
  Archdiocese official website 

 
Christianity in Tamil Nadu
1776 establishments in India